The 2018 Football Federation Victoria season was the fifth season under the new competition format for state-level soccer in Victoria.  The competition consists of seven divisions across the state of Victoria.

League Tables

2018 National Premier Leagues Victoria

The 2018 season was played over 26 rounds. As Premiers, Heidelberg United qualified for the 2018 National Premier Leagues finals series, competing with the other state federation champions in a final knockout tournament to decide the National Premier Leagues 2018 Champion.

Finals

Promotion/relegation play-off

2018 National Premier Leagues Victoria 2 
The 2018 National Premier Leagues Victoria 2 season was played over 28 rounds with each team playing the teams in their conference twice and the other conference once. The top team at the end of the season was promoted to National Premier Leagues Victoria, while the second placed team entered the promotion play-off.

NPL 2 West

NPL 2 East

NPL 2 Grand Final

2018 State League 1

North-West

South-East

2018 State League 2

North-West

South-East

2018 State League 3

North-West

South-East

Promotion/relegation play-offs

2018 Women's National Premier League 

The highest tier domestic football competition in Victoria for women is known for sponsorship reasons as the PS4 Women's National Premier League.   This was the third season of the NPL Women's format. The 10 teams played each other 3 times for a total of 27 games.

Finals

Cup Competitions

2018 Dockerty Cup

Football Victoria soccer clubs competed in 2018 for the Dockerty Cup. The tournament doubled as the Victorian qualifiers for the 2018 FFA Cup, with the top four clubs progressing to the Round of 32. A total of 216 clubs entered the qualifying phase, with the clubs entering in a staggered format.

The Cup was won by Bentleigh Greens.

In addition to the two A-League clubs (Melbourne Victory and Melbourne City), Heidelberg United (as the 2018 National Premier Leagues Champion), the four semi-finalists (Avondale, Bentleigh Greens, Northcote City and Port Melbourne) competed in the final rounds of the 2018 FFA Cup.

References

Football Federation Victoria
Soccer in Victoria (Australia)